Cameron is a town in Calhoun County, South Carolina, United States. The population was 424 at the 2010 census. It is part of the Columbia, South Carolina Metropolitan Statistical Area.

History
The community derives its name from Clan Cameron of Scotland.

The Haigler House and Ulmer-Summers House are listed on the National Register of Historic Places.

Geography
Cameron is located in southern Calhoun County at  (33.557567, -80.715311). U.S. Route 176 (Old State Road) passes through the town, leading northwest  to Columbia and southeast  to Charleston.

Demographics

As of the census of 2000, there were 449 people, 185 households, and 125 families residing in the town. The population density was 143.2 people per square mile (55.2/km2). There were 201 housing units at an average density of 64.1 per square mile (24.7/km2). The racial makeup of the town was 59.47% White and 40.53% African American.

There were 185 households, out of which 25.9% had children under the age of 18 living with them, 51.9% were married couples living together, 11.9% had a female householder with no husband present, and 32.4% were non-families. 30.3% of all households were made up of individuals, and 14.6% had someone living alone who was 65 years of age or older. The average household size was 2.41 and the average family size was 3.04.

In the town, the age distribution of the population shows 24.1% under the age of 18, 4.9% from 18 to 24, 22.9% from 25 to 44, 29.2% from 45 to 64, and 18.9% who were 65 years of age or older. The median age was 43 years. For every 100 females, there were 91.9 males. For every 100 females age 18 and over, there were 101.8 males.

The median income for a household in the town was $39,792, and the median income for a family was $50,000. Males had a median income of $33,542 versus $20,417 for females. The per capita income for the town was $22,463. About 10.2% of families and 12.5% of the population were below the poverty line, including 19.3% of those under age 18 and 9.6% of those age 65 or over.

Economy

Cameron is known for its agricultural economic basis. The main industries within town are: Cameron Mattress Factory (manufacturers of Spring Air), Cameron Cotton & Seed Company (a cotton gin and warehousing company), Carolina Peanuts, LLC and Golden Kernel Pecan Company.

References

External links
History of Cameron

Towns in Calhoun County, South Carolina
Towns in South Carolina
Columbia metropolitan area (South Carolina)